Filippo Mannucci (born 20 July 1974 in Livorno) is an Italian rower.

Filippo Mannucci start rowing at 13 age in C.C.Solvay club; he started the competition the following year with good results. The first success in national competition was in 1992 in junior 1x.

References 
 

1974 births
Living people
Italian male rowers
Sportspeople from Livorno
World Rowing Championships medalists for Italy